Balacra rattrayi is a moth of the  family Erebidae. It was described by Rothschild in 1910. It is found in Burundi, the Democratic Republic of Congo, Kenya, Rwanda and Uganda.

References

Balacra
Moths described in 1910
Erebid moths of Africa